New York Military Academy (NYMA) is a college preparatory, co-ed boarding school in the suburban town of Cornwall,  north of New York City, and one of the oldest military schools in the United States. Originally a boys' school, it started admitting girls in 1975. On March 3, 2015, NYMA filed for Chapter 11 bankruptcy protection, and was sold at auction to Chinese-owned foundation Research Center on Natural Conservation Inc. which reopened the school in November 2015. The Research Center then poured millions of dollars into the campus to support instruction and capital improvements. The campus also has been host to popular camps like Camp All America into the 1980s and currently the NYMA Leadership Program.

History

NYMA has a long history as a university-preparatory school with a military structure that enrolls students from the New York metropolitan area as well as around the country and the world. It was founded in 1889 by American Civil War veteran and former schoolteacher from New Hampshire Charles Jefferson Wright, a former Commandant of Cadets of the nearby Peekskill Military Academy. Wright's successor, Sebastian Jones, presided over the academy from 1894 to 1922, guiding it during its most critical period of growth from a young and small institution of 48 cadets, through a disastrous fire in 1910, and throughout an extensive reconstruction program.  103 students were enrolled in 2019.

During the years 1959-1963, the superintendent was Nathan Dingley III, a veteran of World War I and World War II. On Oct. 12, 1963, the school's drill team participated in the Columbus Day Parade, led by commanding officer Donald Trump.

The academy previously admitted students as early as the fifth grade. Gradually throughout the mid-to-late 1990s, grades five and six were no longer accepted. By the 1999-2000 school-year, the academy only accepted students from the seventh grade on. The seventh grade was removed in the mid-2000s; the school today only accepts grades eight through twelve. In some of its early years, the campus also hosted a non-military "NYMA Lower School" for grades one through six.)

Girls have been admitted since 1975. NYMA is a member of the Association of Military Colleges and Schools of the United States as well as several other school associations.

Financial difficulties
Due to financial problems and enrollment that had dwindled to 145 students, the school was scheduled to close in June 2010. However, a group of alumni and local business people created a plan to save the school, raising almost $6 million of financing in a matter of weeks, and expecting to sell off some less-utilized portions of the campus.

The academy failed to open in September 2015 for the fall semester, and instead headed to bankruptcy auction. On September 30, NYMA was auctioned for $15.825 million to the Chinese-owned Research Center on Natural Conservation Inc., a non-profit corporation led by billionaire Vincent Tianquan Mo, Chairman and CEO of SouFun Holdings, an NYSE-listed company, also operating as Fang Holdings Ltd., one of China's largest real estate internet portals. The foundation also purchased the nearby E.H. Harriman Estate in 2011 and the former Pace University's 37-acre campus in Briarcliff Manor in 2017. The school reopened on November 2, 2015, with "a handful of returning students" and a recruitment drive. For 2016–17, the academic year began with a total of 29 students. By 2019 the school had grown to a size of 100 male and female Cadets both day and boarding with 12 nations represented and an additional 1,000 students attending special programs throughout the year.

Location

The school is located in the town of Cornwall, New York, and uses the mailing address of the village Cornwall-on-Hudson despite being just outside its official boundary.

This places NYMA in the Mid-Hudson region of the Hudson Valley, which is accessible by airplane (Stewart International Airport, Newark Liberty International Airport, LaGuardia Airport, John F. Kennedy International Airport, and Albany International Airport), as well as train (Amtrak and Metro-North), bus (Short Line), and automobile.

Student life
The days at NYMA typically begin at 6:00 am and end at 10:00 pm. Cadets attend classes that match their needs during that time and also participate in interscholastic or intramural sports, activities, and study hall. During closed weekends, cadets are expected to attend additional leadership training, drill & ceremony, and maintain the appearance of their respective barracks. Upon gaining the opportunity for an open weekend, cadets in good academic standing can apply for weekend furlough. Along with Academics, Athletics, and Leadership, the fourth "pillar" of cadet life is Character, reinforced continually by the Cadet Honor Code that NYMA shares with West Point.

Organization

The structure of the Corps of Cadets is adjusted depending on the number of students enrolled at the academy. As a military school, the Junior Reserve Officers' Training Corps (JROTC) is a key component, and participation is required to graduate. The battalion has typically consisted of:
 Command Staff
 Band Company
 Line Companies: Alpha, Bravo, Charlie, Foxtrot and Golf
 Delta troop or "D-troop": a cavalry unit drawn from the equestrian program (not running currently)

Athletics
NYMA has competed in Football, Basketball, Baseball, Soccer, Bowling, Lacrosse, Rugby, Swimming, Softball, Track & Field, Volleyball, Cross-Country, Wrestling, Tennis, Rifle Team, Golf, Drill Team, and Raiders. Every cadet is generally required to compete year-round. The school's mascot is the Knight. Teams have competed in the Hudson Valley Athletic League, a member league of the New England Preparatory School Athletic Conference (NEPSAC). NYMA is reigning champion of New England Preparatory School Athletic Conference Basketball "D" class  2018. In 2019, NYMA expanded its accomplishments to not only include the boys New England Preparatory School Athletic Conference Basketball "D" class championship but also won the girls NEPSAC championship class "E" as well.

Hazing
In earlier decades, NYMA's official regulations permitted a certain level of hazing and physical discipline by supervisors and older cadets, although the academy's senior administrators were forced to resign after a particularly severe incident in 1964.

While hazing later became forbidden by the school's rules and policies, a lawsuit was settled in which it had been claimed that physical and emotional abuse in the form of hazing had taken place in 2005. NYMA cited adverse publicity from the 2005 incident as one of the reasons the school nearly closed in 2010.

Notable alumni

 Robert (Tex) Allen, Class of 1924, actor
 Robert Todd Lincoln Beckwith, Class of 1923 (did not graduate), last descendant of Abraham Lincoln
 Bob Benmosche, Class of 1962, president and CEO of insurance companies MetLife and AIG
 James E. Briggs, Class of 1924, general in U.S. Air Force
 Les Brown, Class of 1932, bandleader
 Daniel Cassidy (1943–2008), author
 Francis Ford Coppola, Class of 1956 (did not graduate), Oscar-winning film director
 Richard J. Daronco (1931–1988), federal judge
 Art Davie, Class of 1964, founder of Ultimate Fighting Championship
 Fairleigh Dickinson Jr., Class of 1937, businessman and politician
 Troy Donahue, Class of 1954, actor
 William C. Eddy (1902–1989), pioneer of electronic technologies
 Homer Gilbert (1909–1943), a.k.a. "Knuckles Boyle," professional football player
 John A. "Junior" Gotti, organized crime figure
 Johnny Green (1908–1989), composer and Oscar-winning music arranger
 Lew Hayman (1908–1984), Canadian football coach
 Robert Douglas Heaton (1873–1933), politician
 Matt Joyce, Class of 1989, professional football player
 Harold F. Linder, Class of 1917, banker and ambassador
 Tarky Lombardi Jr., Class of 1947, politician
 Jack Luden (1902–1951), silent film actor
 Johnny Mandel, Class of 1944, Grammy- and Oscar-winning composer and arranger
 Robert B. McClure, Class of 1915, general in U.S. Army
 Joel Rivera (born 1978), politician
 Andre JL Koo (born 1967), businessman, Direcor of Board of Directors, Chailease Holding
 Alfred Sieminski (1911–1990, did not graduate), politician
 Donald B. Smith, Class of 1965, general in U.S. Army
 Stephen Sondheim, attended 1940–1942, Tony-, Grammy-, Oscar- and Pulitzer-winning composer and lyricist
 Bob Stiller, Class of 1961, founder of Green Mountain Coffee
 Albert Tate Jr., Class of 1937, judge
 Donald Trump, Class of 1964,  45th President of the United States, businessman, television personality
 Spencer Tunick, Class of 1985, photographer

Major buildings

 Academic Building
 Davis Chapel (contains the second-largest theater pipe organ in New York, custom-built by M.P. Moller in 1927)
 Jones Barracks
 Booth Library
 Scarborough Hall
 Pattillo Hall
 Riley (formerly Dingley) Hall
 Dickinson Hall
 Alumni Gym and Pool

References

External links

NYMA Home page
Sample collection of digitized archives
Satellite image of the campus on Google Maps
NYMA Foundation (archived)

1889 establishments in New York (state)
Boarding schools in New York (state)
Companies that filed for Chapter 11 bankruptcy in 2015
Cornwall, New York
Educational institutions established in 1889
Military high schools in the United States
Preparatory schools in New York (state)
Private high schools in New York (state)
Private middle schools in New York (state)
Schools in Orange County, New York
Public venues with a theatre organ